Otheostethus is a genus of beetles in the family Cerambycidae, containing the following species:

 Otheostethus disjunctus Galileo, 1987
 Otheostethus impostor Botero, Galileo & Santos-Silva, 2019
 Otheostethus melanurus Bates, 1872

References

Prioninae